{{Infobox automobile
| name = Vauxhall XVR
| image = 1966 Vauxhall XVR.jpg
| caption = The surviving Vauxhall XVR Mockup
| type = 
| manufacturer = Vauxhall
| aka = 
| production = 1966(three built)
| designer = David Jones (design director)
| class = Concept Car
| body_style = 
| related = 
| layout = FMR Layout
| engine =  Slant-four I4
| transmission = 4 speed manual
| wheelbase = 
| length = 
| width = 
| height = 
| weight = 
| doors = Gullwing Doors
}}

The Vauxhall XVR is a concept car built in 1966 by Vauxhall. The name stands for eXperimental Vauxhall Research. It debuted at the March 1966 Geneva Motor Show receiving favourable reviews from press, but never went into production.

 Production 

Three prototypes of the XVR were built in total. Two were glassfibre rolling mockups with no engines, while one was a metal bodied, fully functional example, built by Motor Panels of Coventry. The fully functional car was the one displayed at the Geneva Motor Show in March 1966. In total, the concept took five months to design and build.

Only one of the mockups survives today, as Vauxhall crushed both the running prototype and the other mockup. The surviving car currently resides at the British Motor Museum''.

Specifications 

The suspension was fully independent in the front and rear, and there were disc brakes at all four corners. The slant four engine was a pre-production model which was later used in the Vauxhall VX4/90.

Design 
The design team for the XVR was directed by David Jones and also included Wayne Cherry, John Taylor, Leo Pruneau, and Judd Holcombe. The looks were inspired by the concept car by Chevrolet, the Mako Shark II which was introduced in 1965. The design incorporates the Mako Shark's split windscreen, pop up headlamps, and gull wing doors.

References 

Cars introduced in 1966
Vauxhall concept vehicles
Automobiles with gull-wing doors
Front mid-engine, rear-wheel-drive vehicles